AGEP is an acronym that may refer to:

 Acute generalized exanthematous pustulosis
 AGEP Association Management, a Belgium-based consultancy for trade unions
 Platelet-activating factor, sometimes abbreviated as AGEPC